The 2011 Fresno State Bulldogs football team represented California State University, Fresno in the 2011 NCAA Division I FBS football season. The Bulldogs were led by 15th-year head coach Pat Hill and played their home games at Bulldog Stadium. They were members of the Western Athletic Conference (WAC). They finished the season 4–9, 3–4 in WAC play to finish in a three way tie for fourth place. Hill was fired at the end of the season after posting a record of 112–80 in 15 seasons.  This was the Bulldogs last year as a member of the WAC. They joined the Mountain West Conference for the 2012 season.

Personnel

Coaching staff

Roster
devante adams

Depth chart

Schedule

Game summaries

vs. California

at No. 10 Nebraska

North Dakota

at Idaho

Ole Miss

No. 6 Boise State

Utah State

at Nevada

Louisiana Tech

at New Mexico State

at Hawaii

San José State

at San Diego State

References

Fresno State
Fresno State Bulldogs football seasons
Fresno State Bulldogs football